The Kansai Collegiate American Football League (関西学生アメリカンフットボール連盟) is an American college football league made up of fifty-three colleges and universities in the Kansai region of Japan.

Overview
The Kansai League is a major college football league in West Japan. The league is divided into three divisions.

The winner of the league receives an automatic bid to the college football playoffs.

Member Schools

Division 1
Division 1 is the highest level in the Kansai league. The winner from Division 1 goes on to play for the West Japan title.

Block A

B Block

Division 2

A Block

B Block

Division 3

A Block

B Block

C Block

D Block

Division 4

Block A

Block B

Open

Six Player

Block A

Block B

Open

Year-by-Year Standings

Division 1

Conference championships

Division 1 champions

Relegation
At the end of every season, there are two relegation games. The two worst teams of Division 1 play the top two teams of Division 2. If the Division 1 team wins their game, they remain in Division 1. However, if they lose, they will be realigned to Division 2 and the team that beat them will be realigned to Division one for the following season.

2013

2014

2015

References

External links
 

 
American football in Japan
American football leagues
College athletics conferences in Japan
1941 establishments in Japan
Sports leagues established in 1941